Merle H. Phillips (September 21, 1928 – December 30, 2013) was a Republican member of the Pennsylvania House of Representatives for the 108th District from 1980 until retiring in 2010. He also was appointed as Northumberland County Commissioner in 2010 to finish Kurt Masser's term after the position was vacated when Masser was elected to the 107th District

Career
Prior to his election to the State House, Phillips was the president of Irish Valley Food Processing.  He served in the United States Marine Corps for four and a half years active duty and two years in the Reserves.

Phillips ended his term serving in House Leadership as Republican Caucus Administrator. Previously, he has served as Republican Chairman and Vice Chairman of the Game and Fisheries Committee and Secretary of the Agricultural and Rural Affairs Committee, as well as serving as a member of the Transportation and Appropriations Committees.

On January 15, 2010, Phillips announced he would not be seeking reelection. Since retiring from the state House of Representatives he has been appointed to fill a vacancy as a commissioner of Northumberland County in November 2010.

On November 8, 2011, Phillips only captured 17% of the vote for Northumberland County Commissioner. He was succeeded by Republican Rick Shoch.

Personal
Representative Phillips resides in Upper Augusta Township.  He and his wife have five children. Merle Phillips died on December 30, 2013.

References

External links

Representative Merle Phillips' official web site
PA House profile

1928 births
2013 deaths
Republican Party members of the Pennsylvania House of Representatives
People from Northumberland County, Pennsylvania
United States Marine Corps officers
Susquehanna University alumni
Military personnel from Pennsylvania